Manceau may refer to:

 A male denizen of Le Mans, France
 A male denizen of the traditional province of Maine, France
 Pays Manceau (Manceau Country), an intermunicipality that incorporates some of the communes of the Sarthe department in France
 Vincent Manceau (born 1989), French footballer

See also

 
 Manceaux (disambiguation)